James Clayton Russell (born January 8, 1986) is an American professional baseball pitcher who is a free agent. He played college baseball at Navarro College and the University of Texas at Austin. He was drafted by the Chicago Cubs in the 14th round of the 2007 Major League Baseball draft out of the University of Texas at Austin  and made his Major League Baseball (MLB) debut on April 5, 2010. He has also played for the Atlanta Braves and Philadelphia Phillies.

High School career
Russell attended Colleyville Heritage High School, where he was a member of the school's baseball team. After his senior year, he was drafted by the Seattle Mariners in the 37th round of the 2004 Major League Baseball draft, but did not sign, instead deciding to attend Navarro College.

College career
Russell was drafted again by the Seattle Mariners in the 17th round of the 2005 Major League Baseball draft, but he did not sign.

Russell later attended the University of Texas at Austin, where he was a starting pitcher for the Texas Longhorns baseball team for one season after transferring from Navarro College. In his only season pitching for the Longhorns, Russell was named to the second team All-Big 12, while posting an 8–4 win–loss record and a 3.86 earned run average (ERA).

Professional career

Chicago Cubs
Russell was drafted by the Chicago Cubs in the 14th round of the 2007 Major League Baseball draft. On August 9, Russell signed a contract worth $350,000 with the Cubs.

After signing, Russell was assigned to the Arizona League Cubs, the Rookie-level affiliate of Chicago. However, after just one start in which he only threw two innings, he was called up to the Single-A Peoria Chiefs. He pitched in two games for the Chiefs, striking out nine batters and allowing just three hits in seven innings. With Peoria, Russell combined to throw a no-hitter on August 25, 2007.

To start 2008, Russell joined the High-A Daytona Cubs. On April 26, he earned his first win of the season against the Jupiter Hammerheads. Three days later, he was called up to the Double-A Tennessee Smokies. He would pitch most of the season with the Smokies before being sent back down to the Cubs for the playoffs. Combined, Russell went 6–8 with a 5.44 ERA and a 1.453 WHIP in 25 starts made.

Russell began the 2009 season with Tennessee. He eventually converted to being a relief pitcher for the Smokies, instead of being a starter. After pitching 11 games for the Smokies, Russell was called up to the Triple-A Iowa Cubs. With Iowa, he was mainly a reliever, but also made seven starts for the Cubs. Between Tennessee and Iowa, Russell went 5–6 with a 4.03 ERA and a 1.403 WHIP in 37 games, including 12 starts. Following the season, he joined the Mesa Solar Sox, a team in the Arizona Fall League, which largely features players considered top prospects.

In 2010, Russell made the Cubs Opening Day roster after giving up no runs in 11 innings of work during spring training and debuted on opening day, April 5, with two scoreless innings against the Atlanta Braves. He became the 97th former Texas Longhorn to make his major league debut.

In 2010, Russell also helped extend Texas' streak of having a former player debut in the major leagues from eight consecutive seasons to nine. He made 20 appearances for the Cubs, going 0–1 with a 4.20 ERA before being optioned to Triple-A Iowa on June 12. However, after making just five appearances for Iowa, Russell was recalled by the Cubs on June 29, after Carlos Zambrano was placed on the restricted list and John Grabow went on the disabled list. He finished the season with a 1–1 record, a 4.96 ERA, and a 1.347 WHIP in 57 appearances for the Cubs. Following the season, the Chicago Tribune stated that the inclusion of Russell and three other inexperienced relievers in the Cubs' bullpen was one of the team's 10 biggest mistakes of the season.

In 2011, Russell made 64 appearances with a 1-6 record, a 4.12 ERA, and 1.33 WHIP. He improved in 2012, recording a 7-1 record, 3.25 ERA, and 1.298 WHIP in 77 games. Russell ended 2013 having pitched in 74 games with a 1-6 record, a 3.59 ERA, and 1.215 WHIP.

Atlanta Braves
Russell and Emilio Bonifacio were traded to the Atlanta Braves for Víctor Caratini on July 31, 2014. He was released by the Braves during spring training in 2015. Russell was signed to a minor league deal by the Chicago Cubs on April 8, 2015. He went 0-2 with a 5.29 ERA for the Cubs in 2015 before being designated for assignment on September 1, 2015.

Philadelphia Phillies
Russell signed a minor league deal with the Philadelphia Phillies on November 12, 2015. He made the Phillies opening day roster in 2016. He was designated for assignment on April 20.

Cleveland Indians
On February 15, 2017, Russell signed a minor league contract with the Cleveland Indians, with an invitation to major league spring training. He was released on March 31, 2017.

Texas AirHogs
Russell signed with the Texas AirHogs of the American Association for part of the 2017 season, before leaving to play in the Mexican League. He made 9 starts and went 3-1 with a 2.79 ERA with 46 strikeouts in 58 innings.

Leones de Yucatán
On July 7, 2017, Russell signed with the Leones de Yucatán of the Mexican Baseball League. He was released on January 9, 2018. 
 He made 5 starts and went 1-0 with a 2.03 ERA with 27 strikeouts in 31 innings.

Detroit Tigers
On January 10, 2018, Russell signed a minor league contract with the Detroit Tigers. He was released on May 4, 2018.

Sugar Land Skeeters
On May 29, 2018, Russell signed with the Sugar Land Skeeters of the Atlantic League of Professional Baseball. Russell and the Skeeters won the Atlantic League Championship and Russell was named the Skeeters Pitcher of the Year. He became a free agent following the 2018 season. He appeared in 20 games 18 starts and went 8-4 with a 2.36 ERA and 98 strikeouts in 106.2 innings.

Toros de Tijuana
On April 3, 2019, Russell signed with the Toros de Tijuana of the Mexican League. Russell did not play in a game in 2020 due to the cancellation of the Mexican League season because of the COVID-19 pandemic.

Algodoneros de Unión Laguna
On March 23, 2021, Russell was traded to the Algodoneros de Unión Laguna of the Mexican League. He was released on December 14, 2021. He made 7 starts and went 2-2 with a 3.67 ERA with 23 strikeouts in 34.1 innings.

Pitching style
Unlike most pitchers who throw a fastball of some sort as their most common pitch, Russell's most common is a slider at 79–83 miles per hour (mph). He also features four-seam and two-seam fastballs (89–90 mph), a cutter (86–88 mph), a curveball (72–75 mph), and a changeup (80–83 mph). Left-handers see almost all four-seamers and sliders (and no change-ups), while right-handers see a larger variety of pitches.

Personal
He is the son of former MLB pitcher Jeff Russell and attended Colleyville Heritage High School in Texas.

See also
List of second-generation Major League Baseball players

References

External links

1986 births
Living people
Algodoneros de Unión Laguna players
American expatriate baseball players in Mexico
Arizona League Cubs players
Atlanta Braves players
Baseball players from Cincinnati
Chicago Cubs players
Colleyville Heritage High School alumni
Daytona Cubs players
Iowa Cubs players
Lehigh Valley IronPigs players
Leones de Yucatán players
Major League Baseball pitchers
Mesa Solar Sox players
Mexican League baseball pitchers
Navarro Bulldogs baseball players
Peoria Chiefs players
Philadelphia Phillies players
Sugar Land Skeeters players
Tennessee Smokies players
Texas AirHogs players
Texas Longhorns baseball players
Tomateros de Culiacán players
Toros de Tijuana players
Toros del Este players
American expatriate baseball players in the Dominican Republic